44th Brigade may refer to:

India
 44th (Ferozepore) Brigade in the First World War
 44th Indian Infantry Brigade in the Second World War

 Ukraine
 44th Artillery Brigade (Ukraine)

 United Kingdom
 44th Infantry Brigade (United Kingdom)
 44th Parachute Brigade (V)
 Artillery Brigades
 44th Anti-Aircraft Brigade (United Kingdom)
 44th (Howitzer) Brigade Royal Field Artillery

 United States
 44th Infantry Brigade Combat Team
 44th Medical Brigade

See also
 44th Division (disambiguation)
 44th Squadron (disambiguation)